Fort Augustus is a settlement in the parish of Boleskine and Abertarff, at the south-west end of Loch Ness, Scottish Highlands. The village has a population of around 646 (2001). Its economy is heavily reliant on tourism.

History

It was renamed Fort Augustus after the Jacobite Rising of 1715. The accepted etymology is that the settlement was originally named after Saint Cummein of Iona who  built a church there. Other suggestions are that it was originally called  after one of two abbots of Iona of the Comyn clan, whose badge  refers to the cumin plant, or that it was called  ("Comyn's Burialplace") after the last Comyn in Lochaber.

In the aftermath of the Jacobite rising in 1715, General Wade built a fort (taking from 1729 until 1742) which was named after Prince William Augustus, Duke of Cumberland. Wade had planned to build a town around the new barracks and call it Wadesburgh.  The settlement grew, and eventually took the name of this fort. The fort was captured by the Jacobites in March 1746, just before the Battle of Culloden.

In 1867, the fort was sold to the Lovat family, and in 1876 they passed the site and land to the Benedictine order. The monks established Fort Augustus Abbey and later a school. The school operated until 1993 when it closed owing to changing educational patterns in Scotland causing a decline in enrollment. The monks employed Tony Harmsworth to devise a rescue package which saw the site converted into the largest private heritage centre in Scotland which operated between 1994 and 1998, however the heritage centre failed to generate sufficient profit to maintain the buildings. In 1998 the monks abandoned the site, and it reverted to the Lovat family which in turn sold it to Terry Nutkins. He also owned The Lovat Hotel that stands on the site of the old Kilwhimen Barracks, one of four built in 1718. This site houses the west curtain wall of the old Fort, intact with gun embrasures. The Lovat was originally built as the local Station Hotel.

Infrastructure
The village is served by the A82 road and lies approximately midway between Inverness (56 km) and Fort William (51 km).

The village was served by a rail line from Spean Bridge to a terminus on the banks of Loch Ness from 1903 until 1933, built by the Invergarry and Fort Augustus Railway in the hope of eventually completing a line to Inverness and latterly operated by the North British Railway and its successor, the London and North Eastern Railway, but initially operated by the Highland Railway. The Caledonian Canal connecting Fort William to Inverness passes through Fort Augustus in a dramatic series of locks stepping down to Loch Ness.

The village is served by the Cill Chuimein Medical Centre.

The village has both a primary school and a secondary school – Kilchuimen Primary School and Kilchuimen Academy – which share a campus.

Climate
As with most of the British Isles and Scotland, Fort Augustus has an oceanic climate (Köppen: Cfb) with cool summers and mild winters. This is the latest point in the run up to summer that such a low temperature has been recorded, suggesting it can become a frost trap on calm clear nights due to its valley location. That same low lying topography can also give rise to some high temperatures on occasion – Fort Augustus held the UK daily high temperature record for 16 December for almost 80 years.

Notable people
 Guy Prendergast (1905–1986), explorer and soldier. Buried in Strathoich cemetery.

See also 
 Glen Urquhart

References

External links

 Fort Augustus
 Fort Augustus Abbey
 Invergarry and Fort Augustus Railway
 Kilchuimen Academy
 Unofficial Fort Augustus Website
 Video of lock operations on the Caledonian Canal at Fort Augustus

Populated places in Inverness committee area
Forts in Scotland
Loch Ness